The Fiat AS.3 was an Italian 12-cylinder, liquid-cooled V engine designed and built in the mid-1920s by Fiat Aviazione especially for the 1927 Schneider Trophy air race.

Design and development
The AS.3 was an increased bore and stroke version of the Fiat AS.2 developed for the 1927 Scheider Trophy seaplane race held at Venice. Despite the increase in capacity the engine retained the same height and frontal area as the AS.2, this was achieved by shortening the connecting rods. 

Two AS.3 powered aircraft placed joint second at the 1927 contest, the winning aircraft was a Napier Lion- powered Supermarine S.5. The AS.3 engine was also used at the 1929 competition, again taking second place.

Applications
Macchi M.52

Specifications (AS.3)

See also

References

Notes

Bibliography

Eves, Edward  The Schneider Trophy Story. Shrewsbury. Airlife Publishing Ltd., 2001. .
Grey, C.G. Jane's all the World's Aircraft 1928. London. Sampson Low, Marston & company Ltd. 1928 

AS.3
1920s aircraft piston engines